Mary E. Hutchinson (July 11, 1906 in Melrose, Massachusetts – July 10, 1970 in Atlanta, Georgia) was an artist and art instructor from Atlanta who lived and worked in New York City during the years of the Great Depression and World War II. She specialized in figure painting, particularly portraits of female subjects. New York critics described these portraits as "sculptural," having a "bold yet rhythmic design," and often possessing a "haunted mood". Critics noted the "introspective" nature of some portraits whose subjects showed "an almost morbidly brooding sensitiveness." From 1934 to 1943 she was a member of the Art Teaching Staff of the WPA New York Federal Art Project. Following her return to Atlanta in 1945 Hutchinson was an art teacher in Catholic high schools.

Art training

Hutchinson took an art course while a student at Agnes Scott College and subsequently studied at the National Academy of Design where she won three awards, one each in sculpture, drawing, and etching. She began taking classes at the Academy as a scholarship student in 1926 and took her last class in 1931. During her five years of study her main interest was sculpture.

Artistic career, early 1930s

In the year following her last class at the Academy Hutchinson showed in group exhibitions at the G.R.D. Studio, in a restaurant-cum-gallery called the Jumble Shop, and in a sidewalk art sale in Washington Square Park. In 1933 she was given both group and duo exhibitions at the Painters and Sculptors' Gallery and participated in group shows at the Brevoort, Roosevelt, and Weston hotels. The statement that Hutchinson's portraits possessed a "haunted mood" came from Howard Devree's review of the duo exhibition which also said the portraits were "instinct with sympathy."

Early in 1934 Hutchinson was given her first solo exhibition and two of her paintings were purchased by the new High Museum of Art in Atlanta. Appearing at Midtown Galleries, the solo exhibition drew praise and generated the most detailed consideration of her work to date. Devree said her talent was maturing, revealing skillful design and a subtler use of color He also remarked on the introspection, sensitivity, and brooding quality brought out in her subjects and on their sculptural quality. A review in the New York Sun paid Hutchinson a compliment by reproducing one of the portraits, "Helen," but the text was not so complimentary, noting a use of hard outlines to reinforce contours which resulted in a loss of "an enveloping atmosphere" and suggesting that her portraits made too "bald a statement." Later in 1934 and over the following two years Hutchinson participated in group shows at Midtown Galleries and the A.C.A. Gallery. She also began showing in group exhibitions sponsored by the National Association of Women Painters and Sculptors whose juries presented her with awards in 1934, 1935, and 1938. In 1935 Hutchinson participated in a duo-exhibition at the Ten Dollar Gallery showing, as Devree said, "brooding portraits" that "have been seen in a number of local galleries" along with abstract pictures made by her mother, Minnie Belle Hutchinson. At that time she also became a member of the New York Society of Women Artists, showing in the tenth annual exhibition of that group and eliciting a favorable comment on one of her paintings.

Artistic career, late 1930s

In the second half of the 1930s Hutchinson continued to participate in group exhibitions held by the National Association of Women Painters and Sculptors as well as ones held by the Midtown and other galleries. Beginning in 1936 paintings of hers were selected to appear in exhibitions sponsored by the New York Municipal Art Committee, the Art Mart, and the Art Institute of Chicago. She also began to exhibit in annual shows held by the Society of Independent Artists. In May 1936 she was one of forty New York artists selected to participate in an exhibition of works from the city and each U.S. state. The group was a prestigious one, including Alexander Archipenko, Charles E. Burchfield, Arthur Dove, William Glackens, Harry Gottlieb, Edward Hopper, Walt Kuhn, Georgia O'Keeffe, John Sloan, and Bradley Walker Tomlin.

Early in 1937 Hutchinson was given a solo exhibition in the mezzanine art gallery of the Barbizon-Plaza hotel. In reviewing the show Howard Devree saw a decade of progress in her paintings as she gradually moved toward "simplification, sureness, subtler color values, inspired by a lively decorative sense."

Hutchinson showed her painting, "The Duet," in her solo exhibition in the Midtown Gallery in 1937 and showed it again the following year when it won the award mentioned above. On both occasions critics voiced mixed feelings about it. In November 1937 a critic for the New York Sun noted a regrettable "tendency to blackness and hard contours" in it and other portraits of the time and in January 1938 a critic, also from the New York Sun, said it was "boldly conceived" and able to dominate the room in which it was hung, but the couple shown were "so 'posed' that they seem almost to have been frozen into their positions." Later that year the critic, Margaret Breuning, called it a "startling" canvas that "hits you between the eyes at first viewing, but has nothing to say after this first violence of onslaught." Hutchinson showed the painting twice more over the next few years and it attracted enough attention to be reproduced in art journals and newspapers. In a 1940 interview Hutchinson said people failed to see the message she intended it to give. In showing a young couple studying a sheet of music—the man being an African American and the woman a white person—she hoped to convey that "through the arts racial barriers are eliminated." Hutchinson was working in a federally-funded neighborhood center in Harlem at the time she painted "The Duet." While employed at the center she made other portraits of African Americans as well. These included "The Composer" and "The Composer at His Keyboard" with Luke Theodore Upshure as the model; "Shine Boy" and "George Griffiths" and "George Griffiths Sleeping" with George Griffiths as the model; and one, "Night," where the model's name is not known.

In 1938 Hutchinson was elected to the board of directors of An American Group Inc. and showed in a thematic exhibition that group put on at Maison Française called "Roofs for 40 million." The following year she was one of 250 members of the American Artists Congress to show work in an exhibition called "Art in a Skyscraper" put on at 444 Madison Avenue.

Reporters interviewed Hutchinson in 1937 and 1940. Both times she made light of her career, explaining in the first of them that her great success when young was in playing singles tennis rather than in painting, mentioning her failing grade in a college art course, and lamenting that a prize for work in sculpture while at the National Academy led merely to work "painting flowers on waste baskets." In the second she explained that she could not abide the rigid technical discipline imposed by her college and academy instructors and wanted the freedom to paint portraits from life.

Artistic career, 1940s and 1950s

During the first half of the 1940s Hutchinson continued to exhibit with three membership organizations—the National Association of Women Artists, the New York Society of Women Artists, and the Society of Independent Artists—and she joined and exhibited with a fourth, the League of American Artists. In 1945 the Studio Gallery produced a duo-artist exhibition of drawings by Hutchinson and watercolors by her mother and during the rest of the 1940s she continued to show with membership organizations but did so at a distance since, following the death of her father that year, she had moved from New York back to Atlanta to live with her mother. In 1953 she participated in a group show held by the National Association of Women Artists devoted to works by members from the state of Georgia. Otherwise, in the 1950s and during the rest of her life she taught art in Catholic high schools in Atlanta and rarely showed her work.

Exhibitions

A list of exhibitions is given in a web site called "Artworks of Mary E. Hutchinson" by Jae Turner.

Art teacher

Hutchinson was employed as an artist-teacher and supervisor of teachers in a community art center located in Harlem between 1935 and 1943.

On relocating to Atlanta in 1945 and for the rest of the 1940s Hutchinson served on the faculty of the High Museum School of Art and its successor the Atlanta Art Institute. Thereafter she taught in Catholic high schools in Atlanta.

Personal information

Hutchinson's father was Merrill Marquand Hutchinson. He was born in Mexico City in 1874 and died in 1945, in Atlanta. Her mother was Minnie Belle Bradford Hutchinson. She was born in Enfield, New Hampshire, in 1875 and died in 1959. At the time of her father's birth, his father, Merrill N. Hutchinson, and his mother, Mary Louise Trask Hutchinson, were leading a Presbyterian mission in Mexico City. Hutchinson's parents were married in Boston, Massachusetts, in September 1905 and she was born in Melrose, Massachusetts, on July 11, 1906. Due to infant fatalities she was raised as an only child. At the time of her birth Merrill was a church organist in New York. In 1908 the family moved to Atlanta where Merrill was both a church organist and director of music in a private school for girls and Minnie Belle, who before her marriage had taught elocution in Boston, was an instructor of voice culture and dramatic expression first in the same school where Merrill worked and later in the school where Hutchinson received her high school education. By 1930 Merrill had become a practitioner of Christian Science while she remained a teacher of expression. Ten years later they were both self-employed practitioners of that faith, he at the age of 66 and she at 65.

Hutchinson's high school, which she attended between 1920 and 1922, was Washington Seminary While at the seminary Hutchinson developed into a champion tennis player. In 1924 and 1925 Hutchinson studied at the Agnes Scott College in Decatur, Georgia.  She lived in New York while studying at the National Academy and remained there during the 1930s and the years of World War II but returned to Atlanta in 1945 after the death of her father. At that time she and her mother rented an apartment and lived together there for the rest of her mother's life. Following her mother's death she continued to live in the same apartment for the rest of her life. Hutchinson never married and from 1931 onward generally shared her life with a succession of women partners.

Other names

Hutchinson's name was usually given as Mary E. Hutchinson. Less frequently it was cited either without the middle initial or in full as Mary Elizabeth Hutchinson.

Notes

References

External links
Stuart A. Rose Manuscript, Archives, and Rare Book Library, Emory University: Mary E. Hutchinson and Dorothy King papers, 1900-1988

20th-century American painters
20th-century American women artists
Modern painters
1906 births
1970 deaths
People of the New Deal arts projects
American women painters
Artists from Atlanta
Painters from Georgia (U.S. state)
Agnes Scott College alumni
National Academy of Design alumni
People from Melrose, Massachusetts
Painters from Massachusetts
American LGBT artists
LGBT people from Massachusetts
LGBT people from Georgia (U.S. state)
20th-century American LGBT people